Space Delta 4 (DEL 4) is a United States Space Force unit responsible for providing strategic and theater missile warning to the United States and its international partners. It operates three constellations of Overhead Persistent Infrared (OPIR) satellites and two types of Ground-Based Radars (GBRs) for the purpose of conducting strategic and theater missile warning. Additionally, DEL 4 provides tipping and cueing to missile defense forces, battlespace awareness to combatant commanders and technical intelligence for further analysis and manages weapon system architectures and ensures operations are intelligence-led, cyber-resilient, and driven by innovation, while postured to operate in a contested, degraded, and operationally-limited environment.

Activated on 24 July 2020, the delta is headquartered at Buckley Space Force Base, Colorado.

DEL 4 was based on the previous 460th Operations Group, 460th Space Wing and 21st Operations Group, 21st Space Wing.

Structure

List of commanders

References 

Deltas of the United States Space Force